Bryn Pydew is a small settlement to the east of Llandudno Junction in North Wales. The limestone hill of Bryn Pydew reaches 128 metres (420 feet) above sea level. The population is around 451 people. Bodysgallen Hall is nearby.

Bryn Pydew is home to one of the 36 sites of the North Wales Wildlife Trust, in addition to the nearby Marl Hall Woods.

Transport
Bryn Pydew used to have a daily scheduled bus service for many years. The village is now only served by buses three times per week: Tuesday, Wednesday and Thursday, operating on request only.

References

Llandudno